Church of St Mary is a Grade I listed church in Eaton Bray, Bedfordshire, England. It became a listed building on 3 February 1967. The arcades of the nave and the font date from the Early English period. There is a 16th-century communion table.

The church was completely reconstructed in the 15th century though the core is 13th-century. The west tower is modern. The arcades of the nave are magnificent; the north arcade is considerably more ornate than the south arcade. The font is of the 13th century. The east window of the south aisle has a central niche and brackets at the sides for sculpted figures.

See also
Grade I listed buildings in Bedfordshire

References

Church of England church buildings in Bedfordshire
Grade I listed churches in Bedfordshire